The Auschwitz concentration camp complex was a system of concentration camps (abbreviated as either KL or KZ) run by Nazi Germany in occupied Poland from 1940 to 1945. The main camp (German: Stammlager) was Auschwitz I. Auschwitz II, or Birkenau, was a concentration and extermination camp, and became the most notorious of the camps. Auschwitz III, or Monowitz, was a labour camp.

In addition to the three largest camps, Auschwitz consisted of several subcamps. The satellite camps were named Aussenlager (external camp), Nebenlager (extension or subcamp), and Arbeitslager (labour camp). Several lay within  of the main camp, with prisoner populations ranging from dozens to several thousand.

KL Auschwitz

Administration 

As the size and purpose of Auschwitz changed during World War II, its structure and chain of command changed too. From 1940 to late 1943, Auschwitz I was the Stammlager and the other camps were subordinate to it. In November 1943 Birkenau and Monowitz became independent camps with their own commandants, although the commandant of Auschwitz I remained the senior officer. Auschwitz I and Birkenau were placed back under one command in November 1944, and Auschwitz III was named Monowitz.

Commandants
Auschwitz I: Rudolf Höss (May 1940 – November 1943), Arthur Liebehenschel from (November 1943 – May 1944), Richard Baer (May 1944 – 27 January 1945)
Birkenau: Fritz Hartjenstein (November 1943 – May 1944), Josef Kramer (May 1944 – November 1944). Other: Johann Schwarzhuber (overseer, men's camp, November 1943 – November 1944)
Monowitz: Heinrich Schwarz (November 1943 – January 1945)

Subcamps 
The known subcamps of the Auschwitz complex included:

See also
List of Nazi concentration camps
 Subcamp (SS)

Notes

References

Further reading 
Der Ort des Terrors: Geschichte der nationalsozialistischen Konzentrationslager (English: Place of Terror: History of the Nazi Concentration Camps), volume 5: Auschwitz

 
Auschwitz